Zdeněk Altner (3 October 1947 – 7 November 2016) was a Czech lawyer and advocate.

Career
Altner is known for filing a suit against the Czech Social Democratic Party (ČSSD) regarding their non-payment of fees owed for services rendered in a dispute over the ownership of the party headquarters in 2001.  Altner said he should receive 165 million Kč (3.3 million Euros) for the job. ČSSD didn't pay the bill, and with fines and late-payment penalties, the amount of the debt rose to about 19 billion Kč (668 million Euros).

The high penalty was disputed by ČSSD leader Jiří Paroubek, who offered 4.4 million Euros as a settlement.

References

1947 births
2016 deaths
20th-century Czech lawyers
21st-century Czech lawyers